Uutisvuoto (Finnish for "newsleak" - the pun works equally in both languages) is the Finnish version of the popular British television quiz show Have I Got News For You. Broadcast on Saturday nights on Yle TV1 since 1998, the show received very high viewing figures. Uutisvuoto was aired on Yle TV1 from 1998 until May 2018, then moved to MTV3 in January 2019.

Uutisvuoto mainly follows the same format as Have I Got News For You. The guests are usually celebrities, and frequently politicians. In two presidential elections, both of the second-round candidates appeared as guests: to-be-president Tarja Halonen and Esko Aho in 2000, and president Halonen and Sauli Niinistö in 2006. Winning the show correlated with winning the election contest itself in both instances. In 2006, the "presidential show" broke all viewing records when it was watched by 1.4 million viewers (in a country of 5.2 million).

The show was so popular in Finland that it was even parodied in the Aku Ankka (Finnish for Donald Duck) comic book as Uutiskuono (news muzzle/snout).

"Haluatteko lukea hyvän vitsin jonka kuulin äsken Yleisradion kahvilassa?" ("Do you want to read a good joke which I just heard at the Yleisradio's cafeteria?") is Peter Nyman's Uutisvuoto joke book. The book's name is a reference to Nyman's way of telling jokes. He opens with the book's name, then, ignoring all answers, continues: "Ei se mitään, kerron sen silti." ("Doesn't matter, I'll tell it anyway.")

Performers
The host of Uutisvuoto was originally Peter Nyman. In 2010, journalist Baba Lybeck took over. Novelist Jari Tervo was one of the permanent team captains for the entire history of the show until 2017. His pair was originally poet Tommy Tabermann, who resigned after being elected to the Finnish parliament in 2006. Tabermann was eventually replaced by comedian Stan Saanila until 2017. Both teams also included a weekly guest member, often a politician or a journalist.

Baba Lybeck (presenter 2010–2018)
Peter Nyman (presenter 1998–2010; 2019–present)
Jari Tervo (captain 1998–2017)
Stan Saanila (captain 2007–2017; 2019–present)
Tommy Tabermann (captain 1998–2007)
Ile Uusivuori (captain 2019–present)

References

External links
 Official site (in Finnish)
 

Finnish comedy television series
Finnish game shows
1990s Finnish television series
1998 Finnish television series debuts
Finnish television series based on British television series
2018 Finnish television series endings
Yle original programming
MTV3 original programming